The 1962 Bowling Green Falcons football team was an American football team that represented Bowling Green State University in the Mid-American Conference (MAC) during the 1962 NCAA University Division football season. In their eighth season under head coach Doyt Perry, the Falcons compiled a 7–1–1 record (5–0–1 against MAC opponents), won the MAC championship, and outscored opponents by a combined total of 204 to 91.

The team's statistical leaders included Tony Ruggiero with 393 passing yards, Don Lisbon with 481 rushing yards, and Jay Cunningham with 259 receiving yards.

Schedule

References

Bowling Green
Bowling Green Falcons football seasons
Mid-American Conference football champion seasons
Bowling Green Falcons football